The Kader Toy Factory fire occurred on 10 May 1993 at a factory in Thailand. It is considered the worst industrial factory fire in history, killing 188 persons, and injuring 469. Most of the victims were young female workers from rural families.

Fire
The factory manufactured stuffed toys and licensed plastic dolls primarily intended for export to the United States and other developed countries. The toys were produced for Disney, Mattel, and others. The factory was on Phutthamonthon Sai 4 Road, in the Sam Phran District of Nakhon Pathom Province. The structures that were destroyed in the blaze were all owned and operated directly by Kader Industrial (Thailand). Kader Industrial was owned by a variety of individuals and businesses from Hong Kong, Taiwan, and Thailand, including Kader Group and Charoen Pokphand. Kader Industrial had two sister companies that also operated at the location on a lease arrangement.

The factory was poorly designed and built. Fire exits drawn in the building plans were not, in fact, constructed, and the existing external doors were locked. The building was reinforced with uninsulated steel girders which quickly weakened and collapsed when they were heated by the flames.

At about 16:00 on May 10, 1993, a small fire was discovered on the first floor of part of the E-shaped building. This portion of the building was used to package and store finished products, meaning there was a significant amount of fuel load present. Fuel loads composed of fabrics, plastics, materials used for stuffing, and additional workplace materials were found in each building of the Kader facility. Workers located in the upper floors were told the fire was minor and were instructed to keep working. The fire alarm in the building did not sound. Areas dedicated to storing finished products caused the fire to spread quickly. Other parts of the factory were full of raw materials which also burned very fast.

Workers in the Building One who tried to escape found the ground floor exit doors to be locked, and the stairwells soon collapsed on top of the workers due to the fire. Many workers jumped from the second, third, and fourth-floor windows in order to escape the flames, resulting in severe injuries and fatalities. Local security guards attempted to put out the flames, but were unsuccessful. A call was made to the local Nakhon Pathom Fire Department at 16:21. 
 
Firefighters arrived at the factory at about 16:40 and found Building One nearly ready to collapse. Rapid spread of the fire due largely to the many flammable materials stored within contributed to the building’s collapse at 17:14, just 53 minutes after the fire department was called.

Fire alarms in Buildings Two and Three had sounded and all workers inside were able to escape before flames spread to the buildings. The fire brigades from Nakhon Pathom and neighboring Bangkok were able to extinguish the fires before these two buildings were destroyed.

Even with the help of hydraulic cranes, it took several days to remove all of the bodies of the victims left in the rubble of Building One.

Aftermath 
Most victims were taken by ambulance to the Sriwichai II Hospital, where 20 died. When the northern stairwell of the collapsed Building One was searched, the bodies of many others were found. These victims died of smoke inhalation, the flames, or the collapse of the building. More people were killed in the fire than in the Triangle Shirtwaist Factory fire; despite this, the incident received little media attention outside Thailand.

The Kader fire created a great deal of interest in the country's fire safety measures, particularly its building code design requirements and enforcement policies. Thai Prime Minister Chuan Leekpai, who traveled to the scene on the evening of the fire, pledged that the government would address fire safety issues. According to the Wall Street Journal (1993), Leekpai called for tough action against those who violate the safety laws. Thai Industry Minister Sanan Kachornprasart said that, "Factories without fire prevention systems will be ordered to install one, or we will shut them down.”

The Wall Street Journal article also stated that labor leaders, safety experts, and officials said that the Kader Toy Factory fire may help tighten building codes and safety regulations, but that lasting progress may still be far off as employers flout rules and governments allow economic growth to take priority over worker safety. Yet another incident occurred two months later at a garment factory where ten female workers perished because they could not escape a fire due to doors being locked and windows barred shut.

As of March 2012, there is a large housing project of both townhouses and single family homes under construction on the site of the fire, being built by Pruksa, a major developer of residential subdivisions in the Bangkok metropolitan area. Potential home buyers are not being informed that the property is the site of this infamous industrial accident, as some superstitious Thais may refuse to live there for fears of being haunted by the ghosts of those who perished in the fire.

Media references
New Zealand singer-songwriter Don McGlashan released a song about the disaster named Toy Factory Fire, on his 2006 album Warm Hand. The song is narrated from the imagined perspective of a New York-based toy company executive who, in the week of the 10th anniversary of the fire, is looking at a number of photographs of the disaster's aftermath. "Here's Bart Simpson with his arms all melted and twisted," he begins. And later: "They said it was a death trap from a text book... Keeping them [the photos] hidden was the best work I ever did."

References

External links

''Globalization and Regulatory Character: Regulatory Reform After the Kader Factory Fire'' by Fiona Haines (2005, Ashgate Publishing,  / )

Fires in Thailand
1993 in Thailand
1993 industrial disasters
1993 fires in Asia
Fire disasters involving barricaded escape routes
Factory fires
May 1993 events in Asia
Toy industry
1993 disasters in Thailand
Man-made disasters in Thailand